Lavaltrie is a city located within the D'Autray Regional County Municipality in the southern part of the region of Lanaudière, Quebec, Canada, northeast of Montreal outside the suburban sprawl of the North Shore (i.e., the suburbs located north of Laval). The population was 13,267 as of the Canada 2011 Census within a land surface area of about 70 square kilometres, with the majority of the territory being used for agricultural activities. .

History

The origins of Lavaltrie go back to the 17th century. Jean Talon, the intendant of New France, gave parcels of land (known as manors) to various lords. The land where Lavaltrie is now situated was given to a lieutenant, Sieur la Valtrie, by Talon in 1672. In the 18th century, land occupants built a new roadway along the Saint Lawrence River linking Montreal and Quebec City, named the Chemin Du Roy and now known as Quebec Route 138. For many decades, Lavaltrie was located in the centre of a large series of manors owned by lords intended to develop the agricultural sector. 

Mostly a rural area until the second half of the 20th century, Lavaltrie has developed steadily due to the growing suburbs of Montreal.

Demographics 

Transportation
Lavaltrie's location near Autoroute 40 and Route 138 gives easy access to Montreal, Laval and the northern crown area of the Greater Montreal area. A-40 also gives Lavaltrie direct links to Trois-Rivières and Quebec City to the east and Ottawa to the west. Autoroute 31 and Route 131 which ends at the junction of the A-40 in Lavaltrie gives the area easy access to more remote and rural regions of the Lanaudière region. However, even though located beside the Saint Lawrence River on its north, the city does not have a direct access to the south with the closest links being Autoroute 25 via the Louis-Hippolyte Lafontaine Tunnel in Montreal to the west or the Berthierville-Sorel ferry to the east (Autoroute 55 in Trois-Rivières via the Laviolette Bridge being the closest roadway link to its east).

Politics

 Source:

Mayor

 Christian Goulet

Education
Commission scolaire des Samares operates francophone public schools:
 École primaire de la Source
 École primaire des Eaux-Vives
 École primaire Jean-Chrysostôme-Chaussé
 École primaire des Amis-Soleils
 École Secondaire de la Rive

The Sir Wilfrid Laurier School Board operates anglophone public schools, including:
 Joliette Elementary School in Saint-Charles-Borromée
 Joliette High School in Joliette

See also
Télesphore Saint-Pierre
 List of municipalities in Quebec

References

External links

 Website of the City of Lavaltrie 

Cities and towns in Quebec
Incorporated places in Lanaudière
Greater Montreal
Quebec populated places on the Saint Lawrence River